Perronet de Villamastray served as bailli of the Principality of Achaea for Prince John of Gravina from November 1322 until 1323.

References

Sources
 
 

14th-century French people
Baillis of the Principality of Achaea
14th-century people from the Principality of Achaea